William Charles Scurry,  (30 October 1895 – 28 December 1963) was an Australian soldier who invented the self-firing "drip rifle" while serving as a private in the Gallipoli campaign during the First World War. He was decorated for his invention and was later commissioned and served as an officer during the fighting on the Western Front, where he commanded a mortar battery before being wounded in action.

In later life Scurry worked as an architectural modeller and orchardist before his war injuries forced him to retire. During the Second World War, he served on home service, as commandant of an internment camp before retiring to civilian life following the end of the war. He died in 1963.

Early life
Scurry was born in Carlton, Melbourne, to William Charles Scurry, an architectural modeller, and his English wife, Bessie Scurry (née Preston). He attended Ascot Vale State School before working for his father's firm. As part of the compulsory training scheme he served in the Senior Cadets before progressing on to the Citizens Forces in 1913 where he served as a colour sergeant before being commissioned as a second lieutenant in May 1914 and assigned to the 58th Infantry (Essendon Rifles).

First World War
Following the outbreak of the First World War, Scurry relinquished his commission and enlisted in the Australian Imperial Force in 1915 as a private. Assigned to the 7th Battalion, he was sent to join the battalion at Gallipoli in November 1915 and was promoted to lance corporal in December. Shortly after his arrival, the Allies decided to evacuate the peninsula and Scurry, along with his friend Alfred 'Bunty' Lawrence developed the self-firing rifle which worked simply by having water from one bully beef tin drip into a lower tin.  When the water in the lower tin, which was attached to the trigger of the rifle, reached a certain weight, the rifle was fired.  This ruse led to the Turkish defenders believing that there were still troops opposing them, even after the soldiers had been evacuated.

For his invention, Scurry was awarded the Distinguished Conduct Medal and Mentioned in Despatches. Following the evacuation, after the AIF had returned to Egypt, Scurry was promoted to sergeant and then later, on 20 February 1916, was again commissioned as a second lieutenant. At this time the AIF underwent a period of expansion and experienced men were needed as cadre for new battalions that were being raised; subsequently Scurry was transferred to the 58th Battalion and in June, as his battalion was deployed to France where they would serve in the trenches along the Western Front, Scurry was promoted to lieutenant.

Shortly after arriving in France, he was placed in command of the 15th Light Trench Mortar Battery on specific request of his brigade commander, Harold Edward Elliott, who had been his battalion commander at Gallipoli, and promoted to temporary captain. For his leadership of this battery, he was later awarded the Military Cross. In 1916, when in Petillon, France, he was badly wounded when inspecting a new kind of fuse on an unexploded bomb. He was evacuated to England and eventually lost the sight in one eye, and his right index finger. However, he continued to serve and became an instructor at I Anzac Corps School at Aveluy in June 1917. He later became the School's chief instructor, before returning to the front in 1918.

Later life
Following the armistice, Scurry returned to Australia in 1919 and he became engaged to Doris Barry, an Army nurse he had met while in France. The couple were married in 1920 and later had four children. He returned to his father's firm, however, in 1923 as his vision failed he was forced to give up working as an architectural modeller. He subsequently moved to Silvan where he became an orchardist before his injury forced him to give up this work also.

During the Second World War, Scurry re-enlisted in the Army on 5 September 1940 and served with the 17th Garrison Battalion with the rank of captain, before later taking up the post of commandant of the Tatura Internment Camp, then with the rank of major. He was discharged on 8 October 1945 and retired to Croydon, where he died on 28 December 1963 of a coronary occlusion. He was later interred at Lilydale cemetery.

Notes

References
 
 .
 .
 .

1895 births
1963 deaths
Australian military personnel of World War I
Australian Army soldiers
Gallipoli campaign
Australian recipients of the Military Cross
Australian recipients of the Distinguished Conduct Medal
20th-century Australian inventors
Australian orchardists
People from Carlton, Victoria
Military personnel from Melbourne
Australian people of English descent